Kevin Moffat  is a Scottish footballer, who plays for the Cobram soccer club in the Goulburn North Eastern Soccer Association in northern Victoria, Australia.

Moffat started his career with Falkirk, and made his first team debut on the opening day of the 2007/08 season in a 4–0 win over Gretna. On 31 January 2008, Moffat moved to Stirling Albion for a month's loan deal to gain useful first team experience. At the Bino's, he was involved in 3 matches before returning to the Bairns. He left by mutual consent in December 2009.

External links

1988 births
Living people
Scottish footballers
Association football forwards
Falkirk F.C. players
Scottish Premier League players
Stirling Albion F.C. players
Arbroath F.C. players